Jerzy Potulicki-Skórzewski (27 July 1894 – 15 August 1950) was a Polish bobsledder. He competed in the four-man event at the 1928 Winter Olympics.

References

1894 births
1950 deaths
Polish male bobsledders
Olympic bobsledders of Poland
Bobsledders at the 1928 Winter Olympics
People from Mödling District
German military personnel of World War I
Polish people of the Polish–Soviet War